Anthony is an unincorporated community in Greenbrier County, West Virginia, United States. Anthony is located along the Greenbrier River, south of Falling Spring.

References

Unincorporated communities in Greenbrier County, West Virginia
Unincorporated communities in West Virginia